Invidious is a free and open-source alternative frontend to YouTube. It is available as a Docker container, or from the GitHub master branch.  It is intended to be used as a lightweight and "privacy-respecting" alternative to the official YouTube website.

Version history 
Invidious was originally released as Version 0.1.0 on 13 August 2018 and was created by Omar Roth. Notable updates include:

Search and play YouTube videos (since 0.1.0)
 Official developer API (since 0.1.0)
 Geo-restriction bypassing (since 0.1.0)
 XSS Protection (since 0.5.0)
 Search filters (since 0.6.0)
 Support for playlist RSS feeds (since 0.6.0)
 1080p video support (since 0.7.0)
 Support for watching playlists (since 0.9.0)
 Support for translations (since 0.13.0)
 Continues support for annotations after YouTube removed them (since 0.13.0)
 Support for .onion instances (since 0.13.0)
 Support for YouTube's "Trending" page (since 0.13.0)
 Support for downloading videos (since 0.14.0)
 Video previews (since 0.17.0)
 Web notifications (since 0.18.0)
 Support for YouTube's "Communities" tab (0.19.0)
 Custom playlists (since 0.20.0)

Technology 
Invidious does not use the official YouTube API, but scrapes the website for video and metadata such as likes and views. This is done intentionally to decrease the amount of data shared with Google. The web-scraping tool is called the Invidious Developer API. It is also partially used in the free and open-source app, Yattee. 

In 2020, Omar Roth stated that he would be stepping down from the project and shutting down the main instance at invidio.us. However, the project still continues and unofficial instances of the service still exist.

See also
 Comparison of YouTube downloaders
 Youtube-dl

References

External links 
 
 Invidious Instances
 
YouTube
Websites
Internet properties established in 2018